C. reinhardtii may refer to:
 Chlamydomonas reinhardtii, a freshwater alga used primarily as a model organism in biology
 Calabaria reinhardtii, the Calabar python, a nonvenomous snake species endemic to west and central Africa